Mantu Debnath (also spelt as Montu Debnath) is an Indian Bengali gymnast from Agartala, Tripura. He won gold medals at national level competition, became the first Indian gymnast to win an international competition in Russia in 1969  and won the Arjuna Award in 1975 for his contributions in gymnastics. Mantu is also the second Indian Arjuna awardee for gymnastics after Sham Lal and the first Arjuna awardee from Tripura. He was trained by Dalip Singh.

See also 

 Gymnastics in India
 Arjuna Award
 Tripura
 Dhaleshwar

References 

Indian male artistic gymnasts
People from Agartala
Living people
Year of birth missing (living people)
Sportspeople from Tripura
Sportsmen from Tripura
Recipients of the Arjuna Award